Shiori Hirata (born 6 November 1999) is a Japanese sports shooter. She competed in the women's 10 metre air rifle event at the 2020 Summer Olympics.

References

External links
 

1999 births
Living people
Japanese female sport shooters
Olympic shooters of Japan
Shooters at the 2020 Summer Olympics
Place of birth missing (living people)